The base load (also baseload) is the minimum level of demand on an electrical grid over a span of time, for example, one week. This demand can be met by unvarying power plants, dispatchable generation, or by a collection of smaller intermittent energy sources, depending on which approach has the best mix of cost, availability and reliability in any particular market. The remainder of demand, varying throughout a day, is met by dispatchable generation which can be turned up or down quickly, such as load following power plants, peaking power plants, or energy storage.

Power plants that do not change their power output quickly, such as large coal or nuclear plants, are generally called baseload power plants. Historically, most or all of base load demand was met with baseload power plants, whereas new capacity based around renewables often employs flexible generation.

Description
Grid operators take long and short term bids to provide electricity over various time periods and balance supply and demand continuously. The detailed adjustments are known as the unit commitment problem in electrical power production.

While historically large power grids used unvarying power plants to meet the base load, there is no specific technical requirement for this to be so.  The base load can equally well be met by the appropriate quantity of intermittent power sources and dispatchable generation.

Unvarying power plants can be coal, nuclear, combined cycle plants, which may take several days to start up and shut down, hydroelectric, geothermal, biogas, biomass, solar thermal with storage and ocean thermal energy conversion. 

The desirable attribute of dispatchability applies to some gas plants, wind (through blade pitch) and hydroelectricity. Grid operators also use curtailment to shut plants out of the grid when their energy is not needed.

Economics 

Grid operators solicit bids to find the cheapest sources of electricity over short and long term buying periods.

Nuclear and coal plants  have very high fixed costs, high plant load factor but very low marginal costs. On the other hand, peak load generators, such as natural gas, have low fixed costs, low plant load factor and high marginal costs.

Coal and nuclear power plants do not change production to match power consumption demands since it is more economical to operate them at constant production levels, and not all power plants are designed for it. However, some nuclear power stations, such as those in France, are physically capable of being used as load following power plants and do alter their output, to some degree, to help meet varying demands.

Some combined-cycle plants usually fuelled by gas, can provide baseload power, as well as being able to be cost-effectively cycled up and down to match more rapid fluctuations in consumption.  

According to National Grid plc chief executive officer Steve Holliday and others, baseload is "outdated".

See also 

 Capacity factor
 Energy demand management
 Grid energy storage
 Load balancing (electrical power)
 Smart grid
 Load following power plant
 Peaking power plant

References

External links
Base Load Power Plants - Fundamentals of Electricity - Broken
Levelized Costs of Electricity Production by Technology - Broken
The Energy Resources and Economics Workbook (.doc) - Broken

Power station technology